Gulzhigit Zhanybekovich Alykulov (born 25 November 2000) is a Kyrgyzstani professional footballer who plays for Kairat.

Career

Club
On 27 January 2020, FC Kairat announced the signing of Alykulov on a two-year contract, with the option of a third.

Career statistics

Club

International

International goals
Scores and results list Kyrgyzstan's goal tally first.

Honours
Kairat
Kazakhstan Premier League: 2020

Individual
Kyrgyzstan Footballer of the Year: 2019

References

External links 
 
 
 
 Profile at Neman Grodno website 

2000 births
Living people
Kyrgyzstani footballers
Association football midfielders
Kyrgyzstan international footballers
Kyrgyzstani expatriate footballers
Expatriate footballers in Turkey
Kyrgyzstani expatriate sportspeople in Turkey
Expatriate footballers in Belarus
Kyrgyzstani expatriate sportspeople in Belarus
Expatriate footballers in Kazakhstan
Kyrgyzstani expatriate sportspeople in Kazakhstan
FC Kara-Balta players
FC Alga Bishkek players
FC Neman Grodno players
FC Kairat players